XHPCIE-FM is a radio station on 90.5 FM in Cuatro Ciénegas, Coahuila. It is known as La Primera and owned by Grupo Zócalo.

History
XHPCIE was awarded in the IFT-4 radio auction of 2017 — the only new FM station in Coahuila as a result of the auction — and came to air with test programs in November 2017. The regular grupera programming began at the end of the year.

References

Radio stations in Coahuila
Radio stations established in 2017
2017 establishments in Mexico